Playground is a 2021 Belgian drama film directed by Laura Wandel. In June 2021, the film was selected to compete in the Un Certain Regard section at the 2021 Cannes Film Festival. At Cannes, it won the FIPRESCI Prize in the Un Certain Regard section.

Playground received the André Cavens Award for Best Film by the Belgian Film Critics Association. At the 11th Magritte Awards, it was nominated for ten awards and won seven, including Best First Feature Film and Best Director for Wandel. It was selected as the Belgian entry for the Best International Feature Film at the 94th Academy Awards.

Plot
A seven-year-old girl witnesses her older brother being bullied. Though he swears her to secrecy, she tells their father and soon finds herself the victim of bullying as well.

Cast
 Maya Vanderbeque as Nora
 Günter Duret as Abel
 Karim Leklou as Finnigan
 Laura Verlinden as Agnes
 Lena Girard Voss as Clémence
 Thao Maerten as David

Accolades

See also
 List of submissions to the 94th Academy Awards for Best International Feature Film
 List of Belgian submissions for the Academy Award for Best International Feature Film

References

External links
 

2021 films
2021 drama films
2020s French-language films
Belgian drama films
Films about bullying
Magritte Award winners
French-language Belgian films